American Goddess at the Rape of Nanking: The Courage of Minnie Vautrin is a biographical book about American missionary Minnie Vautrin and her experience of the Nanjing Massacre in 1937–1938. Written by historian Hua-ling Hu and published in 2000, the book recounts how Vautrin saved thousands of lives of women and children during the Nanking Massacre.  A notable source for the book were the diaries that Vautrin kept during the massacre; these were discovered by author Iris Chang during the research for her book The Rape of Nanking.

See also 

 Finding Iris Chang
 The Good Man of Nanking

References

External links
An American hero in Nanking, Asia Times
Diaries of Vautrin, The Nanking Massacre Project, Yale Divinity School Library

2000 non-fiction books
American biographies
Nanjing Massacre books
History books about the Second Sino-Japanese War